Wallberg (1.722 asl) is a mountain in the Mangfallgebirge, part of the Bavarian Alps in the south of Bavaria, Germany.

General Information 
The Wallberg has made history as the starting point for large distance flights of paragliders and hang-gliders. The Wallberg toboggan run is Germany's longest winter toboggan run. The Wallberg race on the Wallbergstraße, one of the best-known automobile mountain races in the 1960s, has not been held for some time for ecological reasons.

The ascent from the Wallbergbahn valley station near Rottach-Egern leads over a saddle to the left past the Setzberg (1,706 m) to the mountain station of the Wallbergbahn. The Wallberg panorama restaurant is located 1,623 m above sea level, 30 minutes walking below the summit.

The transmitter Wallberg is on the mountain.

Literature (in German)
 "Die Wallbergstraße mit dem Schweiß der Legionäre gepflastert". Tegernseer Tal-Heft Nr. 94, S. 34 ff, Tegernseer Tal Verlag (Archivregister des Tegernseer Tal Verlags)
 Schroeder, Peter: Wallberg-Rennen. 1959–1988. Miesbach: Maurus, 2012.

References

Mountains of Bavaria
Mountains of the Alps
Miesbach (district)